The , signed as Route 7, is one of the routes of the Hanshin Expressway system serving the Keihanshin area.

List of interchanges
The entire expressway lies within Hyōgo Prefecture

See also

References

External links

Roads in Hyōgo Prefecture
7
1985 establishments in Japan